NY1 Rail and Road is a 24-hour cable news channel focusing exclusively on the vehicular traffic and mass transit conditions within the five boroughs of New York City. Owned by Charter Communications through its acquisition of Time Warner Cable in May 2016, the channel is a spin-off from its parent station NY1's popular report of the same name that is available to New York City Spectrum subscribers on channel 214, and on channel 91 in New Jersey and Hudson Valley. NY1 Rail and Road updates every five minutes and has feeds for four different zones (Manhattan and Brooklyn, Queens, Staten Island, and the Hudson Valley.)  The station airs a constant floating digital aerial map of New York City with a short anchor segment every half-hour, along with periodic cutaways indicating mass transit service changes.

The digital map (with data provided by INRIX) highlights major streets which are color-coded according to the speed of traffic with INRIX's common coding, with black, indicating a completely jammed or closed road, red indicating traffic flow of less than 25 miles per hour (dark red if around less than 15 mph), yellow 25–50 mph flow, and green little to no traffic.

References

External links 
http://www.twcnews.com/nyc/all-boroughs.html

24-hour television news channels in the United States
Television stations in New York City
Television channels and stations established in 2010
Spectrum News channels